This is a list of diplomatic missions in Palestine, covering missions accredited to the State of Palestine or to the Palestinian National Authority (PNA).  As Israel controls most of the Palestinian territories that make up the State of Palestine, most missions to the latter are officially termed Representative Offices due to Israel not recognizing a Palestinian state, although this is without prejudice to their official statuses.

Most diplomatic missions to Palestine are resident in Ramallah, while a few countries maintain consulates in East Jerusalem.

Embassies & Representation Offices 

Ramallah
 

 
 

 
 

 

 

 
 
 
 
 
  
  
 
 

 (Embassy) 
 
 (Embassy) 
 

 
 
 
 

 

 (Embassy) 
 
 
 (Embassy) 
 (Embassy) 

East Jerusalem

  - Apostolic Delegation to Jerusalem and Palestine, in East Jerusalem
  - Representative Office of Ireland to the Palestine Authority, East Jerusalem 
  - the Turkish Consul General in East Jerusalem is also accredited as Ambassador of Turkey to the State of Palestine

Unclear status
 (US relations with Palestine is managed through United States Office of Palestine Affairs which, although still part of US Embassy in Jerusalem, reports directly to U.S. State Department on 'substantive matter')

Consulates

Jerusalem

Mission to open
 (representative office)

Gallery

Non-resident missions

Resident in Cairo, Egypt, unless otherwise noted:

Other posts
 (country office)
 (technical assistance office)
 (several agencies, UNRWA)

See also
List of consulates-general in Jerusalem
List of diplomatic missions of Palestine
Foreign relations of Palestine

References

External links
Foreign Missions in Palestine
Foreign Missions in Ramallah, Palestine

Foreign relations of the State of Palestine
Palestine
Diplomatic missions